Brent Powell (born February 8, 1969) is an American politician who has served in the Mississippi House of Representatives from the 59th district since 2013.

References

1969 births
Living people
Republican Party members of the Mississippi House of Representatives
21st-century American politicians